Amazing Grace is an American drama television series created by Deborah Jones. The series stars Patty Duke, Joe Spano, Lorraine Toussaint, Robin Gammell, Marguerite Moreau, Justin Garms, Gavin Harrison and Dan Lauria. The series aired on NBC from April 1, 1995, to September 16, 1995. Shot on location in Duke's adopted hometown of Coeur d'Alene, Idaho, the series featured Duke as a newly ordained minister who had experienced addiction to painkillers.

Cast 
Patty Duke as Hannah Miller
Joe Spano as Detective Dominick Corso
Lorraine Toussaint as Yvonne Price
Robin Gammell as Arthur Sutherland
Marguerite Moreau as Jenny Miller
Justin Garms as Brian Miller
Gavin Harrison as Link
Dan Lauria as Harry Kramer

Episodes

References

External links
 

1990s American drama television series
1995 American television series debuts
1995 American television series endings
English-language television shows
NBC original programming
Television shows filmed in Idaho
Television shows set in Idaho